DYFR (98.7 FM), broadcasting as UP 987, is a non-commercial radio station owned and operated by the Far East Broadcasting Company. The station's studio and transmitter are located at the Immanuel Bible College Compound, Banawa Hills, Cebu City. This station operates 24/7, as of August 2019, prior to that date, it operated daily from 5am to 1pm and from 5pm to midnight in 1975 to 1990s, then later to 5am to 9:30pm from 1990s to 2018, and later from 5am to 10pm to November 2018 to August 2019.

References

Radio stations in Metro Cebu
Christian radio stations in the Philippines
Radio stations established in 1975
Contemporary Christian radio stations
1975 establishments in the Philippines
Far East Broadcasting Company